Olentangy Berlin High School is the fourth, and newest, high school in the Olentangy Local School District.  It opened on August 5, 2018, starting with the first classes on August 15, 2018, in time for the 2018-2019 school year.

History 
Near the building site of Olentangy Berlin High School, there was another school named Berlin Township School, which was operational from 1915 to 1973. The new school takes its name from the old facility. In 2016, a levy was passed to get the funds to build the new school. The new school will provide more space for students as the district grows.

In 2022, Olentangy Berlin was named the "Most Spirited High School in America" by Varsity Brands, and was awarded a check of $25,000 during a pep-rally on August 19th.

See also
Olentangy High School
Olentangy Liberty High School
Olentangy Orange High School

References

External links
 

High schools in Delaware County, Ohio
Public high schools in Ohio